Unterfladnitz is a former municipality in the district of Weiz in the Austrian state of Styria. Since the 2015 Styria municipal structural reform, it is part of the municipality Sankt Ruprecht an der Raab.

Geography
Unterfladnitz lies about 5 km from Weiz.

References

Cities and towns in Weiz District